"Moonshadow" is a song written and performed by Cat Stevens (known since 1978 as Yusuf Islam), first released as a single in the UK in 1970 on the Island label and in the US in 1971 on the A&M label. It also appears on Stevens'  1971 album Teaser and the Firecat.

History

Stevens considers this his favourite of his old songs. When Yusuf appeared on The Chris Isaak Hour in 2009, he said of this song:
"I was on a holiday in Spain. I was a kid from the West End [of London] – bright lights, et cetera. I never got to see the moon on its own in the dark, there were always streetlamps. So there I was on the edge of the water on a beautiful night with the moon glowing, and suddenly I looked down and saw my shadow. I thought that was so cool, I'd never seen it before."

An animated short featuring the song was part of the Fantastic Animation Festival feature film released in 1977. The animation begins with a still frame of Teaser and his pet Firecat, pictured as they appear on the cover of the album bearing their names. The picture comes to life, and in the course of the animation, they find the fallen Moon, ride on it as it flies, and find a way to replace it in the sky. The beginning and ending story portions were written by Cat Stevens and narrated by Spike Milligan. The video also appears as a special feature on the Majikat Concert DVD.

In May 2012 Moonshadow, a new musical by Yusuf, featuring music from throughout his career, opened at the Princess Theatre in Melbourne, Australia. The show received mixed reviews and closed four weeks early.

The song appears as "Moon Shadow" on both the UK and US labels of the single release.

Chart history
"Moonshadow" reached number 30 on the US Billboard Hot 100 chart and number 10 on the US Easy Listening chart.

Cover versions

 Appears on several Greatest Hits albums of Roger Whittaker.
 Recorded by Labelle for their 1972 album, also titled Moon Shadow.
 A version by Liz And the Kids reached #28 in the Canadian AC charts, July 29, 1972.
 Recorded by Mandy Moore on her 2003 cover album Coverage. Moore has also been performing "Moonshadow" on the NBC family comedy-drama This Is Us since 2017.

References

External links
 Moonshadow YouTube video

Cat Stevens songs
Labelle songs
1970 singles
1971 songs
Songs written by Cat Stevens
Song recordings produced by Paul Samwell-Smith
Island Records singles
A&M Records singles